The Carlisle Area School District is a midsized, suburban, public school district that serves the boroughs of Carlisle and Mount Holly Springs and Dickinson Township and North Middleton Township in Cumberland County, Pennsylvania. According to 2000 federal census data, it serves a resident population of 34,794. in 2009, the residents' per capita income was $22,214, while the districts' median family income was $52,276.

Carlisle Area School District operates ten schools, including Carlisle High School, Lamberton Middle School, Wilson Middle School, Bellaire Elementary School, Crestview Elementary School, Hamilton Elementary School, LeTort Elementary School, Mooreland Elementary School, Mount Holly Springs Elementary School and North Dickinson Elementary School. The district is served by the Capital Area Intermediate Unit 15 which offers a variety of services, including a completely developed K-12 curriculum that is mapped and aligned with the Pennsylvania Academic Standards (available online), shared services, a group purchasing program and a wide variety of special education and special needs services.

Extracurriculars
Carlisle Area School District offers a wide variety of extracurriculars, including clubs, organizations and an extensive sports program. The district's varsity and junior varsity athletic activities are under the Pennsylvania Interscholastic Athletic Association.

Sports
The district funds:

Boys
Baseball - AAAA
Basketball- AAAA
Cross Country - Class AAA
Football - AAAA
Golf -AAA
Indoor Track and Field
Lacrosse - AAAA
Soccer - AAA
Swimming and Diving - Class AAA
Tennis - AAA
Track and Field - AAA
Volleyball - Class AAA
Wrestling - AAA

Girls
Basketball - AA
Cross Country - AAA
Field Hockey - AAA
Indoor Track and Field - AAA
Lacrosse - AAA
Soccer (Fall) - AAA
Softball - AAA
Swimming and Diving - AAA
Girls' Tennis - AA
Track and Field - AAA
Volleyball - AAA

Middle School Sports

Boys
Basketball
Cross Country
Soccer
Wrestling	

Girls
Basketball
Cross Country
Field Hockey
Softball (Fall)
Volleyball

According to PIAA directory July 2012

References

School districts in Cumberland County, Pennsylvania